Stanley Mease "Sam" Toyne FRHS (13 June 1881 – 22 February 1962) was an English first-class cricketer and headmaster.

Education and headmaster
Educated at Haileybury and at Hertford College, Oxford, where he was a Classical Exhibitioner, Toyne was a Master at Haileybury between 1906 and 1913. He was headmaster of St Peter's School, York, from 1913 to 1936, where he coached future England captain Norman Yardley, and on the staff of Bedford School between 1937 and 1945. He was a Fellow of the Royal Historical Society and published a number of books on history.

Cricket
A right-handed batsman and an underarm slow bowler, although which arm he bowled with is unknown, Toyne represented Hampshire in a single first-class match in 1905, against Yorkshire. 23 years later, Toyne represented the Marylebone Cricket Club in a single first-class match against Ireland, which was also Toyne's last first-class match.

Death
He died at Broxbourne, Hertfordshire, on 22 February 1962. He had married in 1910.

Publications
 Albrecht von Wallenstein. A monograph: to which is appended an analysis of the Thirty Years War, 1911
 Mediæval England. A framework of English history, 1066-1485, 1913
 The Angevins and the Charter (1154-1216) the beginning of English law, the invasion of Ireland and the crusades, (Bell's English history source books), 1926
 St. Peter's School and Alcuin (York Minster historical tracts), 1927
 The Race. A play of Marathon, etc, 1934
 The Scandinavians in History, 1948
 History Today - Guy Fawkes and the Powder Plot, Toyne S.M., No.1, 1951
 Sark, a feudal survivor, 1959
 Hertfordshire Historical Association, 1961

Family
Toyne's nephew, Herbert Hake OBE represented Hampshire and Cambridge University in first-class cricket.

References

External links
Stanley Toyne at Cricinfo
Stanley Toyne at CricketArchive

1881 births
1962 deaths
People educated at Haileybury and Imperial Service College
Alumni of Hertford College, Oxford
Sportspeople from Bournemouth
Cricketers from Dorset
People from Broxbourne
Hampshire cricketers
Marylebone Cricket Club cricketers
Fellows of the Royal Historical Society